Ptochostola asaphes is a moth in the family Crambidae. It was described by Turner in 1937. It is found in northern Australia.

References

Crambinae
Moths described in 1937